The 1988 World Junior Ice Hockey Championships was the 12th edition of the Ice Hockey World Junior Championship and was held in Moscow, Soviet Union.  Canada and the Soviet Union won the gold and silver medals respectively as the two nations redeemed themselves following their mutual disqualification in the 1987 tournament as a result of the Punch-up in Piestany. Finland won the bronze medal.

Final standings
The 1988 tournament was a round-robin format, with the top three teams winning gold, silver and bronze medals respectively.

Poland was relegated to Pool B for 1989.

Results

Scoring leaders

Tournament awards

Pool B
Eight teams contested the second tier this year in Sapporo Japan from March 12 to 21.  It was played in a simple round robin format, each team playing seven games.

Standings

Norway was promoted to Pool A and Austria was relegated to Pool C for 1989.

Pool C
Eight teams contested the third tier this year in Belluno and Feltre, Italy from March 18 to 27.  It was played in a simple round robin format, each team playing seven games.  The North Korean juniors debuted this year.

Standings

Denmark was initially promoted to Pool B for 1989, however because they used an ineligible player, a challenge series with Italy was played the following December to determine promotion.

References

 
 
1988 World Junior Hockey Championships at TSN
 http://www.passionhockey.com/hockeyarchives/U-20_1988.htm

World Junior Ice Hockey Championships
World Junior Ice Hockey Championships
International ice hockey competitions hosted by the Soviet Union
December 1987 sports events in Europe
January 1988 sports events in Europe
Sports competitions in Moscow
1987 in Moscow
1988 in Moscow
March 1988 sports events in Europe
1987–88 in Japanese ice hockey
Sports competitions in Sapporo
20th century in Sapporo
Belluno
1987–88 in Italian ice hockey
International ice hockey competitions hosted by Japan
International ice hockey competitions hosted by Italy